Cahalan is a surname. Notable people with the surname include:

 Adrienne Cahalan (born 1964), Australian sailor
 Cissie Cahalan (1876–1948), Irish suffragette
 Robert Cahalan (born 1946), American atmospheric scientist
 Sinéad Cahalan, Irish camogie player
 Susannah Cahalan (born 1985), American journalist and author

See also
 Cahalane, surname